Aleksandr Viktorovich Zavadskiy (born 24 August 1966) is a retired Russian professional footballer.

External links
Profile at Footballfacts.ru

1966 births
Living people
Soviet footballers
Russian footballers
Russian Premier League players
Russian expatriate footballers
Expatriate footballers in Hungary
FC Spartak Vladikavkaz players
FC Shinnik Yaroslavl players
FC Sibir Novosibirsk players
FC Yugra Nizhnevartovsk players
Association football defenders
FC Novokuznetsk players